Kim Moo-sung (born 20 September 1951) is a South Korean politician as a member of the Liberty Korea Party. He was previously the Saenuri Party leader from 2014 to 2016.

Education

Kim graduated from Joongdong High School in Seoul in 1970. He graduated from Hanyang University in 1976, majoring in business administration. He also took courses on public policy in Korea University in 1999.

Kim received honorary doctorate degrees from the following institutions: Doctor of Policy from Pukyong National University (2003), Doctor of Public Administration from Korea Maritime and Ocean University (2006) and Honorary Doctor of Political Science from Dongguk University (2015).

Political career
Kim was first elected to the National Assembly representing the Nam District of Busan in 1996 as a member of the then-ruling New Korea Party. He was subsequently elected three more times from the same district and in 2008 was forced to run as an independent after losing renomination from his own party. He again failed to win renomination for the same constituency in 2012 and temporarily left politics between 2012 and 2013. He ran as the Saenuri Party candidate in a by-election held in Yeongdo District, Busan, and won his fifth term in the National Assembly in 2013. In 2014, he was elected leader of the ruling Saenuri Party. However, he resigned in April 2016 after the defeat of Saenuri Party in the National Assembly.

Potential candidacy for presidency 
In a 2015 interview, Kim said he was "not yet qualified to be president". In November 2016, he suspended his presidential campaign process and declared that he would joint the impeachment process against President Park Geun-hye.

Controversy and in popular media

"Charcoal" skin color remarks 
Kim faced criticism for comparing the skin color of a black Nigerian student to that of charcoal briquettes. He later apologized to the Yeungnam University student on 18 December 2015.

"No look pass" 
Kim went viral both in Korea and abroad after he was filmed at an airport arrival area. He slid over a bright light green suitcase manner to his assistant without having looked over where he was passing the suitcase off to, much like the eponymous move used in basketball. This prompted him to be featured on international media outlets, as well as criticized by some as looking elitist and condescending.

Family during Japanese Occupation 
During World War II in the period of Japanese Occupation, Kim's father was reportedly a collaborator who urged Koreans to make donations to support Japan's war efforts.

External links
Official website

References

1951 births
Living people
Members of the National Assembly (South Korea)
South Korean businesspeople
Bareun Party politicians
Conservatism in South Korea
Hanyang University alumni
People from Busan
South Korean Buddhists
Gimhae Kim clan